Poland competed at the 1999 World Championships in Athletics in Seville, Spain, from 20 – 29 August 1999.

Medalists

Sources 

Nations at the 1999 World Championships in Athletics
World Championships in Athletics
Poland at the World Championships in Athletics